Acoustic Magazine is a British glossy monthly publication that deals only in acoustic music.

History and profile
Acoustic was cofounded by Hugo Montgomery-Swan, Mark Tucker and Steve Harvey in 2004. Harvey edited the first twenty issues of the magazine, which is part of Blaze Publishing Ltd..

Originally bi-monthly, it is now a monthly publication and carries reviews, features, lessons, vintage guitar advice and all manner of items to do with this genre.  Columnists include Pierre Bensusan, Maartin Allcock, Doyle Dykes, Chris Gibbons, Kevin Harding, Simon Mayor, Gordon Giltrap, and Julie Ellison.

References

External links

2004 establishments in the United Kingdom
Bi-monthly magazines published in the United Kingdom
Monthly magazines published in the United Kingdom
Music magazines published in the United Kingdom
Guitar magazines
Magazines established in 2004